Brittany Ann Nicole Crew (born March 6, 1994, in Mississauga, Ontario) is a Canadian track and field athlete competing in the shot put.

Crew is an alumna of York University in Toronto.

Career
In July 2016 she was named to Canada's Olympic team.

At the 2017 Summer Universiade in Taipei, Crew won gold with a best throw of 18.34 meters. At the 2018 Commonwealth Games in Gold Coast, Australia, Crew won bronze with a best throw of 18.32 metres.

In 2019, Crew threw 19.28 to break her own Canadian record.

Crew competed at the 2020 Summer Olympics.

Awards and honors
2019 York University Female Athlete of the Year

References

External links
 
 

1994 births
Living people
Athletes from Mississauga
York University alumni
Canadian female shot putters
Athletes (track and field) at the 2016 Summer Olympics
Olympic track and field athletes of Canada
Universiade medalists in athletics (track and field)
Athletes (track and field) at the 2018 Commonwealth Games
Commonwealth Games bronze medallists for Canada
Commonwealth Games medallists in athletics
Universiade gold medalists for Canada
Universiade bronze medalists for Canada
Athletes (track and field) at the 2019 Pan American Games
Pan American Games silver medalists for Canada
Pan American Games medalists in athletics (track and field)
Pan American Games track and field athletes for Canada
Medalists at the 2015 Summer Universiade
Medalists at the 2017 Summer Universiade
Medalists at the 2019 Pan American Games
Athletes (track and field) at the 2020 Summer Olympics
20th-century Canadian women
21st-century Canadian women
Medallists at the 2018 Commonwealth Games